2SER  is a community radio station in Sydney, New South Wales, Australia, broadcasting on the frequency 107.3 FM and is a member of the Community Broadcasting Association of Australia. The station is largely self-supporting, relying upon revenue raised through programming, sponsorship, fund-raising events and membership. Their studios are located in Ultimo and Macquarie, Sydney.

The station has a metro-wide licence and broadcasts a mix of programming styles - specialist music, general magazine and specialist talks. It currently broadcasts 15 talks shows covering topics such as science, current affairs, health, conservation, publishing, gay culture and theatre. 2SER is also one of few media outlets that has a special program for prisoners, Jailbreak. The station helped launch the broadcasting careers of Julie McCrossin, Robbie Buck, Helen Razer, Eleanor Hall, Fenella Kernebone, Steve Ahern and Jonathan Harley - all of whom started out on the station as volunteers.

History
On 1 October 1979 the station was opened by the Federal Minister for Education, Senator John Carrick, and has been broadcasting ever since.

In the mid-1990s the station expanded its programming to emphasise 'underground dance music' which was very popular in Sydney at the time. This caused friction within the station but 2SER organised a series of highly lucrative fund raising events called Freaky Loops in association with Sydney promoters such as Cryogenesis, Clan Analogue, Club Kooky and Elefant Traks which sustained the move to a new musical format for several years until 2001.

In late 2004, the station was faced with a projected budget shortfall of up to $100,000 that financial year. Management addressed the situation by reducing the number of paid staff, putting forward proposals to scale down the use of its studio at Macquarie University and attempting to cater for a slightly older audience - ideas that were met with frustration from some volunteers. Internal activism resulted in a softening of policy. In early 2005 the new program grid was launched, and despite the controversy in its lead up, it proved to be a simple reshuffle of the existing grid, rather than a dramatic overhaul.

The station worked on its improving its brand across the 2003-2005 period, incorporating a fresh new logo and brand elements, while the station's online presence was also redesigned to deliver a rich content experience. Today it runs out of UTS as well as Macquarie University.

Notable guests

See also
 The Wire, an Australian current affairs program broadcast through the Community Radio Satellite

References

 Javes, Sue (14 September 2004) Career launcher 2SER FM celebrates its silver anniversary. Sydney Morning Herald.
 Javes, Sue (10 July 2006) Jailhouse Rock. Sydney Morning Herald.
 Javes, Sue (8 December 2004). Money matters: 2SER relaunch plans. Sydney Morning Herald.
 Evans, Rachel (11 May 2005). Gaywaves ceases broadcasting. Green Left Weekly.

External links
 Official website
 "The Wire" national current affairs
 Diffusion Science Radio
 Razors Edge - current affairs
 The Election Nerds - politics

Radio stations in Sydney
Community radio stations in Australia
Student radio stations in Australia
2SER